Novaya Zarya is a rural locality (a khutor) in Shebekinsky District, Belgorod Oblast, Russia. The population was 10 as of 2010. There are 2 streets.

Geography 
Novaya Zarya is located 46 km northeast of Shebekino (the district's administrative centre) by road. Zavodtsy is the nearest rural locality.

References 

Rural localities in Shebekinsky District